A Moment of Stillness is the third release and first EP by Irish post-rock band God Is an Astronaut. The track "Forever Lost (Reprise)" is a reprise of "Forever Lost" from All Is Violent, All Is Bright. In 2015, the song "Endless Dream" was featured on the 76th episode of Welcome to Night Vale.

Track listing
"Frozen Twilight" – 6:20
"A Moment of Stillness" – 4:47
"Forever Lost (Reprise)" – 5:37
"Elysian Fields" – 3:25
"Crystal Canyon" – 2:00

Bonus tracks (digital release on Bandcamp)
"Endless Dream" – 3:54
"Empyrean Glow" – 2:21
"Sweet Deliverance" – 4:36
"Dark Solstice" – 4:44

References

2006 EPs
God Is an Astronaut albums
Revive Records EPs